The 1992 Nagoya Grampus Eight season was the club's first season as members of the J.League. Due to the transition period between the Japan Soccer League and the J.League no league games were played, however Nagoya Grampus Eight did take part in the newly founded J.League Cup and Emperor's Cup, reaching the First Round of the Emperor's Cup and the Semi-Final of the J.League Cup.

Review and events

Squad

Transfers

In:

Out:

, during the season

Results

Emperor's Cup

J.League Cup

Group stage

Knockout phase

Squad statistics

Appearances and goals

|-
|colspan="14"|Players who left Nagoya Grampus Eight during the season:

Top scorers

Disciplinary record

Notes

References

Other pages
 J. League official site
 Nagoya Grampus official site

Nagoya Grampus Eight
Nagoya Grampus seasons